The district courts are the ordinary trial courts of general jurisdiction under the law of Taiwan. Currently there are 22 district courts under the jurisdiction of the Republic of China (Taiwan).

History
District courts (chihō-hōin) were first established in Taiwan in 1896. The jurisdiction of the district courts changed several times in the Japanese era. There were five (5) district courts in Taiwan as of 1945, the end of the Japanese rule, when the courts were incorporated into the Republic of China court system.

Note that the Empire of Japan was granted extraterritoriality in China from late 19th century until World War II. During this time, Taihoku District Court also handled the trial cases regarding Japanese citizens (including Taiwanese and Korean) in the Chinese provinces of Fujian, Guangdong and Yunnan.

After World War II, more district courts were established as the population growth. The newest district court, Ciaotou District Court, was established in September 2016 in Kaohsiung. This makes the total count of district courts in Taiwan to 22.

List of District Courts 
There are currently 20 district courts under the jurisdiction of the Taiwan High Court and 2 district courts under the jurisdiction of the Fuchien High Court. The Kinmen and Matsu district courts are under the jurisdiction of the Fuchien High Courts as those counties are part of Fujian Province and not part of Taiwan Province. The jurisdictions of district courts do not always follow the boundary of the administrative divisions.

Divisions 
Each District Court may establish summary division for different regions under it, for the adjudication of cases suitable for summary judgment and small claims cases. The civil summary procedure is for cases involving an amount in controversy of not more than 500,000 New Taiwan dollars and for simple legal disputes. The small claims cases are cases demanding payment for less than 100,000 NTD. Currently there are a total of 45 divisions in Taiwan. Additionally, there is a Taiwan Kaohsiung Juvenile Court, established in accordance with the Law Governing the Disposition of Juvenile Cases.

Each of the District Courts has civil, criminal and summary division and may establish specialized divisions to handle cases involving juveniles, family, traffic, and labor matters as well as motions to set aside rulings on violations of the Statute for the Maintenance of Social Order. Each division has a Division Chief Judge who supervises and assigns the business of the division. Each District Court has a Public Defenders' Office and a Probation Officers' Office.

Judges 
A single judge hears and decides cases in ordinary and summary proceedings as well as in small claims cases. A panel of three judges decides cases of great importance in ordinary proceedings as well as appeals or interlocutory appeals from the summary and small claims proceedings. Criminal cases are decided by a panel of three judges, with the exception of summary proceedings which may be held by a single judge. The Juvenile Court hears and decides only cases involving juveniles.

Jurisdiction 

District Courts have jurisdiction over the following cases:
Ordinary or summary civil and criminal cases as well as civil small claim cases as courts of the first instance;
Civil and criminal appeals or interlocutory appeals from decisions rendered by the summary divisions;
Juvenile matters;
Family matters;
Traffic cases;
Civil compulsory execution cases;
Non-contentious matters;
Civil protection writs;
Rehabilitation of delinquents;
Labor-management disputes;
Elections and recalls;
Violations of the Statute for the Maintenance of Social Order;
Other cases prescribed by law.

Dispute 
On 31 March 2017, Taipei District Court finished a judgment of first instance, this is the first time, the collegial court invoked the concept of "civil disobedience", and Identify the motive and purpose of the protest act, are related to public affair. They said the people of Sunflower Movement (As Huang Kuo-chang, Lin Fei-Fan, and related people) all are innocent.

See also 

 History of law in Taiwan
 Law of Taiwan
 Six Codes
 Constitution of the Republic of China
 Judicial Yuan
 Supreme Court of the Republic of China
 High Court (Taiwan)
 Ministry of Justice (Taiwan)
 Supreme Prosecutor Office
 Taiwan High Prosecutors Office
 List of law schools in Taiwan

Gallery

References

External links 

Taiwan Law Resources
The Judicial Yuan
The Ministry of Justice
Taipei District Prosecutors Office
Legislative Yuan
Executive Yuan

Law of Taiwan
District Courts in Taiwan